Luigi Crespi (January 23, 1708 – July 2, 1779) was an Italian painter, and art merchant and historian. He was the son of the prominent Bolognese painter, Giuseppe Maria Crespi.

Biography
He trained with his father and completed a few altarpieces, including for the churches of San Sigismondo in Bologna, San Bartolomeo della Buona Morte in Finale Emilia, the parish church of 
Bastiglia in the Province of Modena, and a "Madonna del Rosario" for the Sanctuary of Valdibrana in Pistoia. in 1748, he was nominated canon of the Collegiata di Santa Maria Maggiore in Bologna. Two years later he became an assistant to Cardinal Lambertini, later Pope Benedict XIV. he traveled to Dresden in 1751–1753. upon returning to Bologna, he worked in the re-issuing and editing of the Carlo Cesare Malvasia's Biographies of Bolognese artists, published in 1753, and titled Felsina pittrice. In the 1760s, he began a career as portraitist in a Neoclassical style. He accumulated a number of honors and appointments, including an appointment as associate professor of the Academy of Fine Arts of Florence in 1770; honorary academic of the Academy of Parma (1774) and of Venice (1776). He died in his native Bologna.

Bibliography
Alessandro Cont, "Ove pennello industre l'imagin tua ritrasse": i gusti e gli studi del Giovin Signore nell'Italia del Settecento, "Rivista storica italiana", 128, 1 (aprile 2016), pp. 106–148

References

1708 births
1779 deaths
18th-century Italian painters
Italian male painters
Italian art historians
Italian neoclassical painters
Painters from Bologna
18th-century Italian male artists